Charles Bourne (13 October 1910 – 26 August 1975) was a Barbadian cricketer. He played in thirteen first-class matches for the Barbados cricket team from 1931 to 1943.

See also
 List of Barbadian representative cricketers

References

External links
 

1910 births
1975 deaths
Barbadian cricketers
Barbados cricketers
People from Saint Michael, Barbados